Emil Anka (born 20 January 1969) is a Hungarian Chess Grandmaster. He moved to the United States in 2010, and lives in Kirkland, WA. He also teaches chess and runs local chess tournaments.

References 

Chess grandmasters
1969 births
Living people